Jyllingevej station is a station on the Frederikssund radial of the S-train network in Copenhagen, Denmark. It has its name from the road of the same name.

See also
 List of railway stations in Denmark

References

S-train (Copenhagen) stations
Railway stations opened in 1949
1949 establishments in Denmark
Railway stations in Denmark opened in the 20th century